Columbiana Centre is a one-story indoor shopping mall located off Interstate 26/U.S. Route 76 on Harbison Boulevard in Columbia, South Carolina that opened in 1990. Most of the mall's territory is located in Lexington County, although portions of the mall extend into Richland County. The regional mall has  of retail space. Its anchors include two Belk stores, Dillard's, and JCPenney. The Men's Belk opened in early 2015 in the former Sears which closed in 2014.

History
Columbiana Centre, developed by Homart Development Company, opened in 1990 with two anchor stores: Belk and Sears. Dillard's was added as the third anchor in 1993, as was a new wing extending diagonally north. In 1995, J. B. White was added as another anchor. In 1998, JB White was acquired by Dillard's and the JB White location in the mall was closed. Belk took over the former JB White space and Parisian came to the mall in the former Belk space. In 2005, Parisian closed and JCPenney took over the former Parisian space. The next major anchor change was brought about by the closure of Sears in March 2014. In 2015, Belk Men's Store was expanded into the former Sears space, adding 50,000 square feet of space for Belk and making it one of Belk's flagship stores.

On February 13, 2017, a Dave and Buster's store opened in the front exterior side of the mall, filling the space vacated by Sears not already filled by the Men's Belk. In March 2018, Forever 21’s Riley Rose cosmetics store opened at the mall.

2022 shooting

A mass shooting, occurred at the mall in the afternoon of April 16, 2022. Fifteen people ranging from 15 to 73-years-old were hurt during the incident, nine of which were from gunshot wounds. Three people have since been arrested and are facing multiple charges ranging from unlawful use of a firearm to attempted murder.

References

External links
 

1990 establishments in South Carolina
Buildings and structures in Columbia, South Carolina
Shopping malls established in 1990
Brookfield Properties
Shopping malls in South Carolina
Tourist attractions in Columbia, South Carolina